Bill Mardo (October 24, 1923 – January 20, 2012) was a writer for The Daily Worker, the Communist Party of America newspaper. He is known for helping fight Major League Baseball's color barrier. He was the last living sportswriter deeply involved in the battle against segregation.

Early life
He was born William Bloom in Manhattan, New York on October 24, 1923, but changed his name when he began his career in journalism.

Journalism career
Mardo joined The Daily Worker in 1942 and remained with them through the early 1950s, when he joined the Soviet news agency Tass.

He died from Parkinson's disease on January 20, 2012, in Manhattan.

References

1923 births
2012 deaths
American communists
American male journalists
American sportswriters
20th-century American journalists